The 2014 Bendigo Women's International (1) was a professional tennis tournament played on outdoor hard courts. It was the 7th edition of the tournament which was part of the 2014 ITF Women's Circuit, offering a total of $50,000 in prize money. It took place in Bendigo, Australia, on 3–9 November 2014. This was the first of two Bendigo events, the second tournament was held a week later.

Singles entrants

Seeds 

1 Rankings as of 27 October 2014

Other entrants 
The following players received wildcards into the singles main draw:
  Naiktha Bains
  Kimberly Birrell
  Isabella Holland
  Abbie Myers

The following players received entry from the qualifying draw:
  Ellen Allgurin
  Mizuno Kijima
  Mai Minokoshi
  Laura Schaeder

The following player received entry with a protected ranking:
  Ksenia Lykina

Champions

Singles 

  Eri Hozumi def.  Risa Ozaki 7–6(7–5), 5–7, 6–2

Doubles 

  Jessica Moore /  Abbie Myers def.  Naiktha Bains /  Karolina Wlodarczak 6–4, 6–0

External links 
 Official website
 2014 Bendigo Women's International (1) at ITFtennis.com

Bendigo Women's International 1
2014 in Australian tennis
Bendigo Women's International
2014 in Australian women's sport